The subdivisions of Jordan are as follows:

 Governorates of Jordan (muhafazah) – first level
 Nahias of Jordan (nahiyah) – second level
 Municipalities (amanah), e.g. Greater Amman Municipality